Gavani may refer to:
Gavani, Iran (disambiguation)
Găvani, Romania